Gordon Charles "Gord" Byers (March 11, 1930 – November 2, 2001) was a Canadian professional ice hockey player. Byers played most of his career in the minor leagues. He played one game in the National Hockey League for the Boston Bruins during the 1949–50 season.

Playing career
After spending his junior days with the Copper Cliff Jr. Redmen and the St. Catharines Teepees, Byers played one game in the National Hockey League for the Boston Bruins during the 1949–50 season and well as two games for the Boston Olympics. The next season, Byers would then have spells in the United States Hockey League for the Kansas City Mohawks and the Tulsa Oilers in what would turn out to be the USHL's final year in operation before folding. He would end up returning to the Olympics for a season before joining the Troy Uncle Sam Trojans. Both teams folded at the conclusion of the respective seasons with the Trojans folding after just one season. After a season of senior hockey with the Chatham Maroons, Byers finished his career in the Northern Ontario Hockey Association with the Sudbury Wolves before retiring.

Career statistics

Regular season and playoffs

See also
 List of players who played only one game in the NHL

External links
 

1930 births
2001 deaths
Boston Bruins players
Boston Olympics players
Canadian expatriate ice hockey players in the United States
Canadian ice hockey defencemen
Ice hockey people from Ontario
People from Renfrew County
Ontario Hockey Association Senior A League (1890–1979) players
St. Catharines Teepees players
Tulsa Oilers (USHL) players